Macrarene farallonensis is a species of sea snail, a marine gastropod mollusk in the family Liotiidae.

Distribution
This marine species occurs in the Pacific Ocean off Farallon Island, near San Francisco, USA. It was originally collected from sea bird guano.

References

External links
 To Biodiversity Heritage Library (2 publications)
 To Encyclopedia of Life
 To ITIS
 To World Register of Marine Species

farallonensis
Gastropods described in 1952